{{DISPLAYTITLE:Tau1 Aquarii}}

Tau1 Aquarii, Latinized from τ1 Aquarii, is the Bayer designation for a single star in the equatorial constellation of Aquarius. With an apparent visual magnitude of 5.66, it is a faint naked eye that requires dark suburban skies for viewing. The star is drifting further away with a radial velocity of +15 km/s. It is a candidate member of the Pisces-Eridanus stellar stream.

The stellar classification of τ1 Aquarii is B9 V; right along the borderline between a B- and A-type main sequence star. This is a candidate silicon star; a type of Ap star of class CP2 that shows a magnetic field. It is around 100 million years old and is spinning rapidly with a projected rotational velocity of 185 km/s. The star has 2.7 times the mass of the Sun and double the Sun's radius. It is radiating 63.5 times the luminosity of the Sun from its photosphere at an effective temperature of 10,617 K. When examined in the infrared band, it displays an excess emission that is a characteristic of stars with an orbiting debris disk. The model that best fits the data suggests there are two concentric circumstellar disks.

References

External links
 Image Tau1 Aquarii

A-type main-sequence stars
Ap stars
Circumstellar disks

Aquarius (constellation)
Aquarii, Tau1
BD-14 6346
Aquarii, 69
215766
112542
8673